Lise Bissonnette  (born December 13, 1945) is a Canadian writer and journalist.

Biography
Born in Rouyn, Quebec, Bissonnette studied education science at the  Université de Montréal from 1965 to 1970.  She later pursued doctoral studies at the University of Strasbourg and the École pratique des hautes études in Paris. In 1974, she became a reporter for the daily newspaper Le Devoir. She became the parliamentary correspondent in Quebec City, then in Ottawa, before taking on the position of editorialist and, finally, that of writer-in-chief in 1982. From 1986 to 1990, she worked as an independent journalist and consultant, and collaborated with many Quebec and Canadian media organizations. She writes a weekly article on Quebec affairs for the Canadian daily newspaper The Globe and Mail, as well as monthly articles for the magazines L'actualité and Montreal Magazine. In 1990, she returned to Le Devoir, where she served as editor-in-chief until 1998. Bissonnette appears regularly as an analyst on both French and English news programs on public and private radio and television networks.

She has also published two novels, Marie suivait l'été (1992) and Affaires d'art (1996), and a short story collection, Quittes et doubles (1997). 

She holds seven doctorates honoris causa: from the Université de Sherbrooke, State University of New York, Concordia University, Laurentian University, Université Laval, Université de Montréal, and the University of Ottawa.

Bissonnette was the president and general director of the Bibliothèque et Archives nationales du Québec, formerly known as the Bibliothèque nationale du Québec. She was appointed to this position in 1998, and left the post after 11 years of service.

She is a member of the Union of Quebec Writers.

Awards and honours
She was shortlisted for the Governor General's Award for French-language non-fiction at the 1987 Governor General's Awards for her essay collection La passion du présent, and for the Governor General's Award for French-language fiction at the 1992 Governor General's Awards for Marie suivait l'été and at the 1997 Governor General's Awards for Quittes et doubles.

Bissonnette received the Order of Francophones of America in 1993.  She was elected member of the Academy of Letters and the Social sciences of the Royal Society of Canada in 1994. In 1998, she was made an Officer of the National Order of Quebec.  In 2000, she was awarded the French Légion d'honneur, and received the new  mérite d'honneur of French and of Francophone education, bestowed by the Quebec Minister of International Relations, Louise Beaudoin.

References

1945 births
Living people
Canadian newspaper reporters and correspondents
Officers of the National Order of Quebec
Officers of the Order of Canada
University of Paris alumni
Journalists from Quebec
Writers from Quebec
Canadian novelists in French
Canadian short story writers in French
People from Rouyn-Noranda
Canadian women novelists
Canadian women short story writers
Canadian women journalists
The Globe and Mail columnists
Canadian women columnists
20th-century Canadian novelists
20th-century Canadian short story writers
20th-century Canadian essayists
20th-century Canadian women writers
Canadian women essayists
Canadian non-fiction writers in French
Le Devoir people
Canadian expatriates in France